George Weaver may refer to:

 George Weaver (educator) (1872–1939), American educator and physician
 Buck Weaver George Daniel Weaver (1890–1956), American baseball player
 George Weaver (politician) (1908–1986), Canadian Member of Parliament and engineer
 George L. P. Weaver (1912–1995), American trade unionist and civil rights activist